Teplostan Upland is an upland located in the Tyoply Stan District, in southwest Moscow, on the right bank of the Moskva.

See also
 List of highest points of Russian federal subjects

References 

Hills of Moscow
Highest points of Russian federal subjects